Cytochromes P450 (CYPs) are a superfamily of enzymes containing heme as a cofactor that function as monooxygenases. In mammals, these proteins oxidize steroids, fatty acids, and xenobiotics, and are important for the clearance of various compounds, as well as for hormone synthesis and breakdown. In 1963, Estabrook, Cooper, and Rosenthal described the role of CYP as a catalyst in steroid hormone synthesis and drug metabolism. In plants, these proteins are important for the biosynthesis of defensive compounds, fatty acids, and hormones.

CYP enzymes have been identified in all kingdoms of life: animals, plants, fungi, protists, bacteria, and archaea, as well as in viruses. However, they are not omnipresent; for example, they have not been found in Escherichia coli. , more than 300,000 distinct CYP proteins are known.

CYPs are, in general, the terminal oxidase enzymes in electron transfer chains, broadly categorized as P450-containing systems. The term "P450" is derived from the spectrophotometric peak at the wavelength of the absorption maximum of the enzyme (450 nm) when it is in the reduced state and complexed with carbon monoxide. Most CYPs require a protein partner to deliver one or more electrons to reduce the iron (and eventually molecular oxygen).

Nomenclature
Genes encoding CYP enzymes, and the enzymes themselves, are designated with the root symbol CYP for the superfamily, followed by a number indicating the gene family, a capital letter indicating the subfamily, and another numeral for the individual gene. The convention is to italicise the name when referring to the gene. For example, CYP2E1 is the gene that encodes the enzyme CYP2E1—one of the enzymes involved in paracetamol (acetaminophen) metabolism. The CYP nomenclature is the official naming convention, although occasionally CYP450 or CYP450 is used synonymously. However, some gene or enzyme names for CYPs may differ from this nomenclature, denoting the catalytic activity and the name of the compound used as substrate. Examples include CYP5A1, thromboxane A2 synthase, abbreviated to TBXAS1 (ThromBoXane A2 Synthase 1), and CYP51A1, lanosterol 14-α-demethylase, sometimes unofficially abbreviated to LDM according to its substrate (Lanosterol) and activity (DeMethylation).

The current nomenclature guidelines suggest that members of new CYP families share at least 40% amino-acid identity, while members of subfamilies must share at least 55% amino-acid identity. Nomenclature committees assign and track both base gene names (Cytochrome P450 Homepage ) and allele names (CYP Allele Nomenclature Committee).

Classification 

Based on the nature of the electron transfer proteins, CYPs can be classified into several groups:

Microsomal P450 systems in which electrons are transferred from NADPH via cytochrome P450 reductase (variously CPR, POR, or CYPOR). Cytochrome b5 (cyb5) can also contribute reducing power to this system after being reduced by cytochrome b5 reductase (CYB5R).
Mitochondrial P450 systems which employ adrenodoxin reductase and adrenodoxin to transfer electrons from NADPH to P450.
Bacterial P450 systems which employ a ferredoxin reductase and a ferredoxin to transfer electrons to P450.
CYB5R/cyb5/P450 systems in which both electrons required by the CYP come from cytochrome b5.
FMN/Fd/P450 systems originally found in Rhodococcus species, in which a FMN-domain-containing reductase is fused to the CYP.
P450 only systems which do not require external reducing power. Notable ones include thromboxane synthase (CYP5), prostacyclin synthase (CYP8), and CYP74A (allene oxide synthase).

The most common reaction catalyzed by cytochromes P450 is a monooxygenase reaction, e.g., insertion of one atom of oxygen into the aliphatic position of an organic substrate (RH), while the other oxygen atom is reduced to water:
 Many hydroxylation reactions (insertion of hydroxyl groups) use CYP enzymes.

Mechanism

Structure 
The active site of cytochrome P450 contains a heme-iron center. The iron is tethered to the protein via a cysteine  thiolate ligand. This cysteine and several flanking residues are highly conserved in known CYPs, and have the formal PROSITE signature consensus pattern [FW] - [SGNH] - x - [GD] - {F} - [RKHPT] - {P} - C - [LIVMFAP] - [GAD]. Because of the vast variety of reactions catalyzed by CYPs, the activities and properties of the many CYPs differ in many aspects. In general, the P450 catalytic cycle proceeds as follows:

Catalytic cycle
 Substrate binds in proximity to the heme group, on the side opposite to the axial thiolate.  Substrate binding induces a change in the conformation of the active site, often displacing a water molecule from the distal axial coordination position of the heme iron, and changing the state of the heme iron from low-spin to high-spin. 
 Substrate binding induces electron transfer from NAD(P)H via cytochrome P450 reductase or another associated reductase.
 Molecular oxygen binds to the resulting ferrous heme center at the distal axial coordination position, initially giving a dioxygen adduct similar to oxy-myoglobin.
 A second electron is transferred, from either cytochrome P450 reductase, ferredoxins, or cytochrome b5, reducing the Fe-O2 adduct to give a short-lived peroxo state.
 The peroxo group formed in step 4 is rapidly protonated twice, releasing one molecule of water and forming the highly reactive species referred to as P450 Compound 1 (or just Compound I).  This highly reactive intermediate was isolated in 2010, P450 Compound 1 is an iron(IV) oxo (or ferryl) species with an additional oxidizing equivalent delocalized over the porphyrin and thiolate ligands. Evidence for the alternative perferryl iron(V)-oxo is lacking.
 Depending on the substrate and enzyme involved, P450 enzymes can catalyze any of a wide variety of reactions.  A hypothetical hydroxylation is shown in this illustration.  After the product has been released from the active site, the enzyme returns to its original state, with a water molecule returning to occupy the distal coordination position of the iron nucleus.

 An alternative route for mono-oxygenation is via the "peroxide shunt" (path "S" in figure). This pathway entails oxidation of the ferric-substrate complex with oxygen-atom donors such as peroxides and hypochlorites.  A hypothetical peroxide "XOOH" is shown in the diagram.

Spectroscopy
Binding of substrate is reflected in the spectral properties of the enzyme, with an increase in absorbance at 390 nm and a decrease at 420 nm. This can be measured by difference spectroscopies and is referred to as the "type I" difference spectrum (see inset graph in figure).  Some substrates cause an opposite change in spectral properties, a "reverse type I" spectrum, by processes that are as yet unclear.  Inhibitors and certain substrates that bind directly to the heme iron give rise to the type II difference spectrum, with a maximum at 430 nm and a minimum at 390 nm (see inset graph in figure).  If no reducing equivalents are available, this complex may remain stable, allowing the degree of binding to be determined from absorbance measurements in vitro
C: If carbon monoxide (CO) binds to reduced P450, the catalytic cycle is interrupted. This reaction yields the classic CO difference spectrum with a maximum at 450 nm. However, the interruptive and inhibitory effects of CO varies upon different CYPs such that the CYP3A family is relatively less affected.

P450s in humans
Human CYPs are primarily membrane-associated proteins located either in the inner membrane of mitochondria or in the endoplasmic reticulum of cells. CYPs metabolize thousands of endogenous and exogenous chemicals. Some CYPs metabolize only one (or a very few) substrates, such as CYP19 (aromatase), while others may metabolize multiple substrates. Both of these characteristics account for their central importance in medicine. Cytochrome P450 enzymes are present in most tissues of the body, and play important roles in hormone synthesis and breakdown (including estrogen and testosterone synthesis and metabolism), cholesterol synthesis, and vitamin D metabolism. Cytochrome P450 enzymes also function to metabolize potentially toxic compounds, including drugs and products of endogenous metabolism such as bilirubin, principally in the liver.

The Human Genome Project has identified 57 human genes coding for the various cytochrome P450 enzymes.

Drug metabolism

CYPs are the major enzymes involved in drug metabolism, accounting for about 75% of the total metabolism. Most drugs undergo deactivation by CYPs, either directly or by facilitated excretion from the body. Also, many substances are bioactivated by CYPs to form their active compounds like the antiplatelet drug clopidogrel and the opiate codeine.

Drug interaction
Many drugs may increase or decrease the activity of various CYP isozymes either by inducing the biosynthesis of an isozyme (enzyme induction) or by directly inhibiting the activity of the CYP (enzyme inhibition). A classical example includes anti-epileptic drugs, such as Phenytoin, which induces CYP1A2, CYP2C9, CYP2C19, and CYP3A4.

Effects on CYP isozyme activity are a major source of adverse drug interactions, since changes in CYP enzyme activity may affect the metabolism and clearance of various drugs. For example, if one drug inhibits the CYP-mediated metabolism of another drug, the second drug may accumulate within the body to toxic levels. Hence, these drug interactions may necessitate dosage adjustments or choosing drugs that do not interact with the CYP system. Such drug interactions are especially important to consider when using drugs of vital importance to the patient, drugs with significant side-effects, or drugs with a narrow therapeutic index, but any drug may be subject to an altered plasma concentration due to altered drug metabolism.

Many substrates for CYP3A4 are drugs with a narrow therapeutic index, such as amiodarone or carbamazepine. Because these drugs are metabolized by CYP3A4, the mean plasma levels of these drugs may increase because of enzyme inhibition or decrease because of enzyme induction.

Interaction of other substances
Naturally occurring compounds may also induce or inhibit CYP activity. For example, bioactive compounds found in grapefruit juice and some other fruit juices, including bergamottin, dihydroxybergamottin, and paradicin-A, have been found to inhibit CYP3A4-mediated metabolism of certain medications, leading to increased bioavailability and, thus, the strong possibility of overdosing. Because of this risk, avoiding grapefruit juice and fresh grapefruits entirely while on drugs is usually advised.

Other examples:
Saint-John's wort, a common herbal remedy induces CYP3A4, but also inhibits CYP1A1, CYP1B1.
Tobacco smoking induces CYP1A2 (example CYP1A2 substrates are clozapine, olanzapine, and fluvoxamine)
At relatively high concentrations, starfruit juice has also been shown to inhibit CYP2A6 and other CYPs. Watercress is also a known inhibitor of the cytochrome P450 CYP2E1, which may result in altered drug metabolism for individuals on certain medications (e.g., chlorzoxazone).
 Tributyltin has been found to inhibit the function of cytochrome P450, leading to masculinization of mollusks.
 Goldenseal, with its two notable alkaloids berberine and hydrastine, has been shown to alter P450-marker enzymatic activities (involving CYP2C9, CYP2D6, and CYP3A4).

Other specific CYP functions

Steroid hormones

A subset of cytochrome P450 enzymes play important roles in the synthesis of steroid hormones (steroidogenesis) by the adrenals, gonads, and peripheral tissue:
CYP11A1 (also known as P450scc or P450c11a1) in adrenal mitochondria affects "the activity formerly known as 20,22-desmolase" (steroid 20α-hydroxylase, steroid 22-hydroxylase, cholesterol side-chain scission).
CYP11B1 (encoding the protein P450c11β) found in the inner mitochondrial membrane of adrenal cortex has steroid 11β-hydroxylase, steroid 18-hydroxylase, and steroid 18-methyloxidase activities.
CYP11B2 (encoding the protein P450c11AS), found only in the mitochondria of the adrenal zona glomerulosa, has steroid 11β-hydroxylase, steroid 18-hydroxylase, and steroid 18-methyloxidase activities.
CYP17A1, in endoplasmic reticulum of adrenal cortex has steroid 17α-hydroxylase and 17,20-lyase activities.
CYP21A2 (P450c21) in adrenal cortex conducts 21-hydroxylase activity.
CYP19A (P450arom, aromatase) in endoplasmic reticulum of gonads, brain, adipose tissue, and elsewhere catalyzes aromatization of androgens to estrogens.

Polyunsaturated fatty acids and eicosanoids
Certain cytochrome P450 enzymes are critical in metabolizing polyunsaturated fatty acids (PUFAs) to biologically active, intercellular cell signaling molecules (eicosanoids) and/or metabolize biologically active metabolites of the PUFA to less active or inactive products.  These CYPs possess cytochrome P450 omega hydroxylase and/or epoxygenase enzyme activity.
CYP1A1, CYP1A2, and CYP2E1 metabolize endogenous PUFAs to signaling molecules: they metabolize arachidonic acid (i.e. AA) to 19-hydroxyeicosatetraenoic acid (i.e. 19-HETE; see 20-hydroxyeicosatetraenoic acid); eicosapentaenoic acid (i.e. EPA) to epoxyeicosatetraenoic acids (i.e. EEQs); and docosahexaenoic acid (i.e. DHA) to epoxydocosapentaenoic acids (i.e. EDPs).
CYP2C8, CYP2C9, CYP2C18, CYP2C19, and CYP2J2 metabolize endogenous PUFAs to signaling molecules: they metabolize AA to epoxyeicosatetraenoic acids (i.e. EETs); EPA to EEQs; and DHA to EDPs.
CYP2S1 metabolizes PUFA to signaling molecules: it metabolizes AA to EETs and EPA to EEQs.
CYP3A4 metabolizes AA to EET signaling molecules. 
CYP4A11 metabolizes endogenous PUFAs to signaling molecules: it metabolizes AA to 20-HETE and EETs; it also hydroxylates DHA to 22-hydroxy-DHA (i.e. 12-HDHA).
CYP4F2, CYP4F3A, and CYP4F3B (see CYP4F3 for latter two CYPs) metabolize PUFAs to signaling molecules: they metabolizes AA to 20-HETE. They also metabolize EPA to 19-hydroxyeicosapentaenoic acid (19-HEPE) and 20-hydroxyeicosapentaenoic acid (20-HEPE) as well as metabolize DHA to 22-HDA.  They also inactivate or reduce the activity of signaling molecules: they metabolize leukotriene B4 (LTB4) to 20-hydroxy-LTB4, 5-hydroxyeicosatetraenoic acid (5-HETE) to 5,20-diHETE, 5-oxo-eicosatetraenoic acid (5-oxo-ETE) to 5-oxo,20-hydroxy-ETE, 12-hydroxyeicosatetraenoic acid (12-HETE) to 12,20-diHETE, EETs to 20-hydroxy-EETs, and lipoxins to 20-hydroxy products.
CYP4F8 and CYP4F12 metabolize PUFAs to signaling molecules: they metabolizes EPA to EEQs and DHA to EDPs. They also metabolize AA to 18-hydroxyeicosatetraenoic acid (18-HETE) and 19-HETE.
CYP4F11 inactivates or reduces the activity of signaling molecules: it metabolizes LTB4 to 20-hydroxy-LTB4, (5-HETE) to 5,20-diHETE, (5-oxo-ETE) to 5-oxo,20-hydroxy-ETE, (12-HETE) to 12,20-diHETE, EETs to 20-hydroxy-EETs, and lipoxins to 20-hydroxy products.
CYP4F22 ω-hydroxylates extremely long "very long chain fatty acids", i.e. fatty acids that are 28 or more carbons long. The ω-hydroxylation of these special fatty acids is critical to creating and maintaining the skin's water barrier function; autosomal recessive inactivating mutations of CYP4F22 are associated with the Lamellar ichthyosis subtype of Congenital ichthyosiform erythrodema in humans.

CYP families in humans
Humans have 57 genes and more than 59 pseudogenes divided among 18 families of cytochrome P450 genes and 43 subfamilies. This is a summary of the genes and of the proteins they encode. See the homepage of the cytochrome P450 Nomenclature Committee for detailed information.

P450s in other species

Animals 
Animals often have more CYP genes than do humans. Reported numbers range from 35 genes in the sponge Amphimedon queenslandica to 235 genes in the cephalochordate Branchiostoma floridae. Mice have genes for 101 CYPs, and sea urchins have even more (perhaps as many as 120 genes).
Most CYP enzymes are presumed to have monooxygenase activity, as is the case for most mammalian CYPs that have been investigated (except for, e.g., CYP19 and CYP5). Gene and genome sequencing is far outpacing biochemical characterization of enzymatic function, though many genes with close homology to CYPs with known function have been found, giving clues to their functionality.

The classes of CYPs most often investigated in non-human animals are those either involved in development (e.g., retinoic acid or hormone metabolism) or involved in the metabolism of toxic compounds (such as heterocyclic amines or polyaromatic hydrocarbons). Often there are differences in gene regulation or enzyme function of CYPs in related animals that explain observed differences in susceptibility to toxic compounds (ex. canines' inability to metabolize xanthines such as caffeine). Some drugs undergo metabolism in both species via different enzymes, resulting in different metabolites, while other drugs are metabolized in one species but excreted unchanged in another species. For this reason, one species's reaction to a substance is not a reliable indication of the substance's effects in humans. A species of Sonoran Desert Drosophila that uses an upregulated expression of the CYP28A1 gene for detoxification of cacti rot is Drosophila mettleri. Flies of this species have adapted an upregulation of this gene due to exposure of high levels of alkaloids in host plants.

CYPs have been extensively examined in mice, rats, dogs, and less so in zebrafish, in order to facilitate use of these model organisms in drug discovery and toxicology. Recently CYPs have also been discovered in avian species, in particular turkeys, that may turn out to be a useful model for cancer research in humans. CYP1A5 and CYP3A37 in turkeys were found to be very similar to the human CYP1A2 and CYP3A4 respectively, in terms of their kinetic properties as well as in the metabolism of aflatoxin B1.

CYPs have also been heavily studied in insects, often to understand pesticide resistance.  For example, CYP6G1 is linked to insecticide resistance in DDT-resistant Drosophila melanogaster and CYP6M2 in the mosquito malaria vector Anopheles gambiae is capable of directly metabolizing pyrethroids.

Microbial 

Microbial cytochromes P450 are often soluble enzymes and are involved in diverse metabolic processes. In bacteria the distribution of P450s is very variable with many bacteria having no identified P450s (e.g. E.coli). Some bacteria, predominantly actinomycetes, have numerous P450s (e.g.,). Those so far identified are generally involved in either biotransformation of xenobiotic compounds (e.g. CYP105A1 from Streptomyces griseolus metabolizes sulfonylurea herbicides to less toxic derivatives,) or are part of specialised metabolite biosynthetic pathways (e.g. CYP170B1 catalyses production of the sesquiterpenoid albaflavenone in Streptomyces albus). Although no P450 has yet been shown to be essential in a microbe, the CYP105 family is highly conserved with a representative in every streptomycete genome sequenced so far. Due to the solubility of bacterial P450 enzymes, they are generally regarded as easier to work with than the predominantly membrane bound eukaryotic P450s. This, combined with the remarkable chemistry they catalyse, has led to many studies using the heterologously expressed proteins in vitro. Few studies have investigated what P450s do in vivo, what the natural substrate(s) are and how P450s contribute to survival of the bacteria in the natural environment.Three examples that have contributed significantly to structural and mechanistic studies are listed here, but many different families exist.

 Cytochrome P450 cam (CYP101A1) originally from Pseudomonas putida has been used as a model for many cytochromes P450 and was the first cytochrome P450 three-dimensional protein structure solved by X-ray crystallography.  This enzyme is part of a camphor-hydroxylating catalytic cycle consisting of two electron transfer steps from putidaredoxin, a 2Fe-2S cluster-containing protein cofactor.
 Cytochrome P450 eryF (CYP107A1) originally from the actinomycete bacterium Saccharopolyspora erythraea is responsible for the biosynthesis of the antibiotic erythromycin by C6-hydroxylation of the macrolide 6-deoxyerythronolide B.
 Cytochrome P450 BM3 (CYP102A1) from the soil bacterium Bacillus megaterium catalyzes the NADPH-dependent hydroxylation of several long-chain fatty acids at the ω–1 through ω–3 positions. Unlike almost every other known CYP (except CYP505A1, cytochrome P450 foxy), it constitutes a natural fusion protein between the CYP domain and an electron donating cofactor. Thus, BM3 is potentially very useful in biotechnological applications.
 Cytochrome P450 119 (CYP119A1) isolated from the thermophillic archea Sulfolobus solfataricus  has been used in a variety of mechanistic studies. Because thermophillic enzymes evolved to function at high temperatures, they tend to function more slowly at room temperature (if at all) and are therefore excellent mechanistic models.

Fungi 

The commonly used azole class antifungal drugs work by inhibition of the fungal cytochrome P450 14α-demethylase. This interrupts the conversion of lanosterol to ergosterol, a component of the fungal cell membrane.  (This is useful only because humans' P450 have a different sensitivity; this is how this class of antifungals work.)

Significant research is ongoing into fungal P450s, as a number of fungi are pathogenic to humans (such as Candida yeast and Aspergillus) and to plants.

Cunninghamella elegans is a candidate for use as a model for mammalian drug metabolism.

Plants 

Cytochromes P450 are involved in a variety of processes of plant growth, development, and defense. It is estimated that CYP P450 genes make up approximately 1% of the plant genome. These enzymes lead to various fatty acid conjugates, plant hormones, secondary metabolites, lignins, and a variety of defensive compounds.

Cytochrome P450s play an important role in plant defense– involvement in phytoalexin biosynthesis, hormone metabolism, and biosynthesis of diverse secondary metabolites. The expression of cytochrome p450 genes is regulated in response to environmental stresses indicative of a critical role in plant defense mechanisms.

Phytoalexins have shown to be important in plant defense mechanisms as they are antimicrobial compounds produced by plants in response to plant pathogens. Phytoalexins are not pathogen-specific, but rather plant-specific; each plant has its own unique set of phytoalexins. However, they can still attack a wide range of different pathogens. Arabidopsis is a plant closely related to cabbage and mustard and produces the phytoalexin camalexin. Camalexin originates from tryptophan and its biosynthesis involves five cytochrome P450 enzymes. The five cytochrome P450 enzymes include CYP79B2, CYP79B3, CYP71A12, CYP71A13, and CYP71B15. The first step of camalexin biosynthesis produces indole-3-acetaldoxime (IAOx) from tryptophan and is catalyzed by either CYP79B2 or CYP79B3. IAOx is then immediately converted to indole-3-acetonitrile (IAN) and is controlled by either CYP71A13 or its homolog CYP71A12. The last two steps of the biosynthesis pathway of camalexin are catalyzed by CYP71B15. In these steps, indole-3-carboxylic acid (DHCA) is formed from cysteine-indole-3-acetonitrile (Cys(IAN)) followed by the biosynthesis of camalexin. There are some intermediate steps within the pathway that remain unclear, but it is well understood that cytochrome P450 is pivotal in camalexin biosynthesis and that this phytoalexin plays a major role in plant defense mechanisms.

Cytochrome P450s are largely responsible for the synthesis of the jasmonic acid (JA), a common hormonal defenses against abiotic and biotic stresses for plant cells. For example, a P450, CYP74A is involved in the dehydration reaction to produce an insatiable allene oxide from hydroperoxide. JA chemical reactions are critical in the presence of biotic stresses that can be caused by plant wounding, specifically shown in the plant, Arabidopsis. As a prohormone, jasmonic acid must be converted to the JA-isoleucine (JA-Ile) conjugate by JAR1 catalysation in order to be considered activated. Then, JA-Ile synthesis leads to the assembly of the co-receptor complex compo`sed of COI1 and several JAZ proteins. Under low JA-Ile conditions, the JAZ protein components act as transcriptional repressors to suppress downstream JA genes. However, under adequate JA-Ile conditions, the JAZ proteins are ubiquitinated and undergo degradation through the 26S proteasome, resulting in functional downstream effects. Furthermore, several CYP94s (CYP94C1 and CYP94B3) are related to JA-Ile turnover and show that JA-Ile oxidation status impacts plant signaling in a catabolic manner. Cytochrome P450 hormonal regulation in response to extracellular and intracellular stresses is critical for proper plant defense response. This has been proven through thorough analysis of various CYP P450s in jasmonic acid and phytoalexin pathways.

Cytochrome P450 aromatic O-demethylase, which is made of two distinct promiscuous parts: a cytochrome P450 protein (GcoA) and three domain reductase, is significant for its ability to convert Lignin, the aromatic biopolymer common in plant cell walls, into renewable carbon chains in a catabolic set of reactions. In short, it is a facilitator of a critical step in Lignin conversion.

P450s in biotechnology 

The remarkable reactivity and substrate promiscuity of P450s have long attracted the attention of chemists. Recent progress towards realizing the potential of using P450s towards difficult oxidations have included: (i) eliminating the need for natural co-factors by replacing them with inexpensive peroxide containing molecules, (ii) exploring the compatibility of P450s with organic solvents, and (iii) the use of small, non-chiral auxiliaries to predictably direct P450 oxidation.

InterPro subfamilies

InterPro subfamilies:
Cytochrome P450, B-class 
Cytochrome P450, mitochondrial 
Cytochrome P450, E-class, group I 
Cytochrome P450, E-class, group II 
Cytochrome P450, E-class, group IV 
Aromatase
Clozapine, imipramine, paracetamol, phenacetin Heterocyclic aryl amines
Inducible and CYP1A2 5-10% deficient
oxidize uroporphyrinogen to uroporphyrin (CYP1A2) in heme metabolism, but they may have additional undiscovered endogenous substrates. 
are inducible by some polycyclic hydrocarbons, some of which are found in cigarette smoke and charred food.

These enzymes are of interest, because in assays, they can activate compounds to carcinogens. 
High levels of CYP1A2 have been linked to an increased risk of colon cancer. Since the 1A2 enzyme can be induced by cigarette smoking, this links smoking with colon cancer.

See also 

 Steroidogenic enzyme
 Cytochrome P450 oxidoreductase deficiency
 CYP11 family
 Cytochrome P450 engineering

References

Further reading

External links 

 
 
 
 
 

 
EC 1.14
Pharmacokinetics
Metabolism
Integral membrane proteins